The 2013 All Japan Indoor Tennis Championships was a professional tennis tournament played on carpet. It was the 17th edition of the tournament which was part of the 2013 ATP Challenger Tour. It took place in Kyoto, Japan between 4 and 10 March.

ATP singles main-draw entrants

Seeds

 1 Rankings are as of February 25, 2013.

Other entrants
The following players received wildcards into the singles main draw:
  Takuto Niki
  Masato Shiga
  Kento Takeuchi
  Yasutaka Uchiyama

The following players received entry from the qualifying draw:
  Hiroki Kondo
  Toshihide Matsui
  Adrian Sikora
  Michael Venus

The following player received entry by a lucky loser:
  Shuichi Sekiguchi

Doubles main-draw entrants

Seeds

1 Rankings as of February 24, 2013.

Other entrants
The following pairs received wildcards into the doubles main draw:
  Sho Katayama /  Bumpei Sato
  Hiroki Kondo /  Hiroki Moriya
  Kento Takeuchi /  Kaichi Uchida

The following pairs received entry as an alternate into the doubles main draw:
  Hiroyasu Ehara /  Shuichi Sekiguchi
  Yuichi Ito /  Takuto Niki

Champions

Singles

 John Millman def.  Marco Chiudinelli, 4–6, 6–4, 7–6(7–2)

Doubles

 Purav Raja /  Divij Sharan def.  Chris Guccione /  Matt Reid, 6–4, 7–5

External links
Official Website

All Japan Indoor Tennis Championships
All Japan Indoor Tennis Championships
All Indoor Tennis Championships